The 2015 Monster Energy FIM Speedway World Cup Final was the last and final race of the 2015 edition of the Speedway World Cup. It was staged on June 14 at the Vojens Speedway Center in Vojens, Denmark, after the initial staging on June 13 was abandoned due to heavy rain. It was won by Sweden, the first time they have achieved success since 2004. They beat hosts and defending champions Denmark by two points, while Poland edged out Australia to claim third.

Sweden were led to success by captain Andreas Jonsson and the returning Fredrik Lindgren, while Antonio Lindbäck and Linus Sundström also contributed vital points. With just two heats remaining it looked likely that Denmark would retain their title as they held a four-point lead over the Swedes. Kenneth Bjerre suffered an engine failure in heat 19 though, while Lindgren went on to win the heat and reduce the gap to a single point. Danish captain Niels-Kristian Iversen was then excluded from the final heat, and Jonsson won the re-run to secure a two-point victory for Sweden.

Results

Scores

References

See also 
 2015 Speedway Grand Prix

2015 Speedway World Cup